Dmitri Nikolayevich Grachyov (born 6 September 1983) is a former Russian footballer. He played centre back.

After seven years in the Russian First Division, late in August 2009 he proceeded to Saturn Moscow Oblast of the Premier League. He made his professional debut in the Russian First Division in 2002 for FC Fakel Voronezh.

References

1983 births
Living people
Russian footballers
FC Fakel Voronezh players
FC KAMAZ Naberezhnye Chelny players
FC Saturn Ramenskoye players
Russian Premier League players
FC Spartak Vladikavkaz players
FC Ufa players
FC Zvezda Irkutsk players
FC Luch Vladivostok players
Association football defenders
FC Sheksna Cherepovets players
Sportspeople from Voronezh